John Francis David Shaul VC (11 September 1873 – 14 September 1953) was an English recipient of the Victoria Cross, the highest and most prestigious award for gallantry in the face of the enemy that can be awarded to British and Commonwealth forces.

Details
Shaul was 26 years old, and a corporal in the Band of the 1st Battalion, Highland Light Infantry, British Army during the Second Boer War when the following deed took place at the Battle of Magersfontein for which he was awarded the VC.

Further information
He later achieved the rank of Sergeant Bugler (a Bandsman in charge of the Bugle Platoon) in the British Army and served in the South African Army in World War I as a Bandmaster. John Shaul is the only  former pupil from the Duke of York's Royal Military School to have been awarded the Victoria Cross. The medal is in the Lord Ashcroft VC Collection.

References

Monuments to Courage (David Harvey, 1999)
The Register of the Victoria Cross (This England, 1997)
Victoria Crosses of the Anglo-Boer War (Ian Uys, 2000)
angloboerwar.com

External links
 Victoriacross.org
 Auction details

1873 births
1953 deaths
Burials in South Africa
Military personnel from Norfolk
British recipients of the Victoria Cross
Second Boer War recipients of the Victoria Cross
British Army personnel of the Second Boer War
Highland Light Infantry soldiers
South African military personnel of World War I
English emigrants to South Africa
People from King's Lynn
British military musicians
British military personnel of the 1898 Occupation of Crete
British colonial army soldiers
British Army recipients of the Victoria Cross
People educated at the Duke of York's Royal Military School